Fort Rapp (once called Fort Moltke) is part of the 14 fortifications erected in Alsace by the Prussian general Von Moltke after the fall of Strasbourg in 1870 during the Franco-Prussian War and following the siege of Strasbourg. 

Built between 1872–1874 and inaugurated on 26 September 1874, it was part of the fortifications meant to protect the city from French attacks. Since 1918 and the return of Alsace-Lorraine to France, it is named after the French general Jean Rapp.

The fort is located in Reichstett, a village situated 10 minutes north of Strasbourg and belonging to the Urban Community of Strasbourg.

The fort contains 200 rooms and was able to host a garrison of 800 men. It was protected by 18 cannons of 90-150mm.

Tourist visits 

The site is open for tourist visits on weekends from mid April to late September.

As of fall 2008, 50% of the fort was available for tourist visits. 

A guide is present at the site.

Gallery

External links 

1. Association des amis du Fort Rapp 

Buildings and structures in Bas-Rhin
Rapp
Military and war museums in France
Museums in Bas-Rhin